The Norlin Quadrangle Historic District comprises the core of the main campus of the University of Colorado campus in Boulder, Colorado. The twelve buildings were designed to reflect a variety of architectural styles. The quadrangle was named after University of Colorado president George Norlin. Buildings on the quadrangle include the Norlin Library, Woodbury Arts and Sciences Building, Old Main, the Hale Science Building, University Theater, Macky Concert Hall and the Women's Studies Cottage.

Design
According to its 1979 NRHP nomination, there are four types of buildings in the district:  pioneer Victorian brick buildings including the Old Main building;  stone buildings with Gothic or Romanesque Revival stylings; two light brick European ones; and the "Rural Italian Renaissance buildings" designed by Charles Klauder. The quadrangle occupies much of the land that was donated by Boulder residents for the university in 1872.

Klauder's initial plans were developed in 1919, proposing the demolition of most of the older buildings in the area. The university's rapid growth discouraged the removal of buildings, and the quadrangle's design evolved to accommodate them. In addition to the landscape design and exterior architectural character of the district, the interiors of the component buildings show a notable attention to detail.

Major components
The chief contributing buildings in the district are:
 Old Main (1876), E.H. Dimick, architect
 Macky Auditorium (1902-1922), Gove and Walsh, architects
 Woodbury Arts and Sciences Building (1890), F.A. Hale, architect
 Norlin Library (1939), Charles Z. Klauder, architect
 Ekeley Chemical Laboratories (1898, 1925, 1973), Ernest Varian original structure, Klauder 1925
 Hellems Arts and Sciences Building (1921), Klauder
 University Theater 1921, Klauder
 Guggenheim Geography Building (1902)
 Cottage Number 1 (1885)
 Hale Science Building (1892-1895)
 Koenig Alumni Center (1885), Varian
 '''McKenna Languages Building (1937), Klauder

Norlin Quadrangle was listed on the National Register of Historic Places on March 27, 1980.

References

University and college buildings on the National Register of Historic Places in Colorado
Victorian architecture in Colorado
University of Colorado Boulder campus
Historic districts on the National Register of Historic Places in Colorado
National Register of Historic Places in Boulder County, Colorado